Storyland (or Story Land) can refer to:

 Storyland, a theme park in Renfrew, Ontario, Canada
 Story Land, a theme park in Glen, New Hampshire
 Storyland, a theme park in Fresno, California
 Storyland, a children's theme park at the New Orleans City Park in Louisiana, United States